Dr. Lloyd Walton (born November 23, 1953) is a retired American basketball player. He grew up in Chicago Heights, Illinois and played basketball for Mount Carmel High School, where he was named a Parade Magazine All American, and Marquette University, playing for legendary Marquette coach Al McGuire, named 2nd team All American. Walton, a 6'1' (1.83 m) point guard, was drafted by the Milwaukee Bucks in 1976 and played for the Bucks from 1977 to 1980, and for the Kansas City Kings in 1980–81.

Since retiring as a player, he has served in various volunteer and professional capacities related to prep, collegiate and professional basketball, including: Assistant Coach under Rick Majerus at Marquette University, a Regional Collegiate Scout for the New York Knicks, Assistant Coach for the LaCrosse Bobcats of the Continental League, and Assistant Coach at the NBA Pre-Draft. He has also held several positions in the public sector, including Bureau Chief for the Illinois Department of Human Services and Executive Director of both The James Jordan Boys & Girls Club & Family Life Center and the Washington Park YMCA both in Chicago.

Lloyd is currently senior career counselor for the National Basketball Players Association, where he has logged over 2,000 counseling hours with NBA players. In 2009, he created Life Long Winners LLC Consulting. The Company is designed specifically for servicing Athletes with Life Coaching, Transition Planning, Motivational Speaking, and the Life Long Winners personal development model. Lloyd received his Doctoral Degree in Organizational Leadership from Argosy University in 2015, which makes him only the third player in NBA history to achieve this level of education. In 2018 Lloyd became a certified life coach from World Coach Institute.

Career statistics

NBA

Regular season

|-
| align="left" | 1976–77
| align="left" | Milwaukee
| 53 || - || 12.8 || .468 || - || .815 || 1.0 || 2.7 || 0.8 || 0.0 || 4.3
|-
| align="left" | 1977–78
| align="left" | Milwaukee
| 76 || - || 16.6 || .448 || - || .651 || 1.0 || 3.3 || 1.0 || 0.2 || 4.8
|-
| align="left" | 1978–79
| align="left" | Milwaukee
| 75 || - || 18.4 || .480 || - || .678 || 1.4 || 4.7 || 1.0 || 0.1 || 5.0
|-
| align="left" | 1979–80
| align="left" | Milwaukee
| 76 || - || 16.4 || .455 || .333 || .690 || 1.2 || 3.8 || 0.6 || 0.0 || 3.6
|-
| align="left" | 1980–81
| align="left" | Kansas City
| 61 || - || 13.5 || .413 || .000 || .788 || 0.8 || 3.4 || 0.5 || 0.0 || 3.4
|- class="sortbottom"
| style="text-align:center;" colspan="2"| Career
| 341 || - || 15.8 || .454 || .250 || .711 || 1.1 || 3.6 || 0.8 || 0.1 || 4.2
|}

Playoffs

|-
| align="left" | 1977–78
| align="left" | Milwaukee
| 9 || - || 13.8 || .486 || - || .615 || 0.4 || 4.1 || 0.9 || 0.3 || 4.7
|-
| align="left" | 1979–80
| align="left" | Milwaukee
| 1 || - || 4.0 || .000 || .000 || .000 || 1.0 || 1.0 || 0.0 || 1.0 || 0.0
|-
| align="left" | 1980–81
| align="left" | Kansas City
| 8 || - || 9.1 || .267 || .000 || .750 || 0.9 || 2.4 || 0.5 || 0.0 || 1.4
|- class="sortbottom"
| style="text-align:center;" colspan="2"| Career
| 18 || - || 11.2 || .412 || .000 || .647 || 0.7 || 3.2 || 0.7 || 0.2 || 2.9
|}

College

|-
| align="left" | 1973–74
| align="left" | Marquette
| 31 || - || - || .422 || - || .783 || 2.5 || 4.5 || - || - || 9.4
|-
| align="left" | 1974–75
| align="left" | Marquette
| 27 || - || - || .455 || - || .789 || 2.7 || 5.9 || - || - || 15.1
|-
| align="left" | 1975–76
| align="left" | Marquette
| 29 || - || 36.3 || .425 || - || .789 || 2.4 || 6.3 || - || - || 10.6
|- class="sortbottom"
| style="text-align:center;" colspan="2"| Career
| 87 || - || 36.3 || .436 || - || .787 || 2.6 || 5.5 || - || - || 11.6
|}

External links 
 NBA statistics @ basketballreference.com
 LifelongWinners
 College Stats

1953 births
Living people
African-American basketball players
American men's basketball players
American motivational speakers
Kansas City Kings players
Marquette Golden Eagles men's basketball players
Milwaukee Bucks draft picks
Milwaukee Bucks players
Moberly Greyhounds men's basketball players
Parade High School All-Americans (boys' basketball)
Point guards
Basketball players from Chicago
21st-century African-American people
20th-century African-American sportspeople